Sevier County is a county in Utah, United States. As of the 2010 United States Census, the population was 20,802. Its county seat and largest city is Richfield.

History
Evidence of indigenous peoples residing in Sevier County up to 5,000 BP has been unearthed. The Fremont culture of Native Americans occupied the area from about 2000 to 700 BP. The Clear Creek site contains native petroglyphs from that period.

In Utah, the Numic- (or Shoshonean) speaking peoples of the Uto-Aztecan language family evolved into four distinct groups in the historical period: the Northern Shoshone, Goshute or Western Shoshone, Southern Paiute, and Ute peoples. This territory's central and eastern sections were occupied primarily by various bands of the Ute.

The first modern sighting of the Sevier River was most likely by the Catholic fathers Silvestre Vélez de Escalante and Francisco Atanasio Domínguez, on their expedition to California in 1776. The Old Spanish Trail was the route they mapped. Over the next century, this trail carried fur trappers, hunters, government officials, traders, and settlers.

Settlement of this area began when Richfield was first settled. Mormon settlers arrived on June 15, 1864, most of whom had emigrated from Scandinavian countries. Because of the growth in this small community, the people soon petitioned Utah Territory officials about a separate county.

On January 16, 1865, the Utah Territory legislature created the county, with the area annexed from Sanpete County. It was named for the Sevier River. The county seat was Big Spring (later named Richfield). The county borders were adjusted in 1866, 1880, 1890, and in 1921. A clarification of boundary lines corresponding to government survey lines was completed in 1931, marking the present configuration of Sevier County.

Although the county was in place by 1865, much of Sevier County was abandoned in the Black Hawk War in 1867. Attempts to resettle the area were not successful until 1870. By 1874, 753 residents lived in the area.

Geography
Sevier County terrain consists of semi-arid but arable rolling areas punctuated by northeast-southwest mountain ridges, usually forested. The highest point is Fish Lake Hightop in the Central Utah Plateau, at 11,633' (3546m) ASL.

Major highways

Adjacent counties
 Sanpete County - north
 Emery County - east
 Wayne County - southeast
 Piute County - south
 Beaver County - southwest
 Millard County - west

Protected areas

 Capitol Reef National Park (part)
 Fishlake National Forest (part)
 Fremont Indian State Park and Museum
 Koosharem Reservoir Recreation Site
 Manti-La Sal National Forest (part)
 Sand Ledges Recreation Area
 Willow Creek Wildlife Management Area

Lakes

 Abes Reservoir
 Acord Lakes
 Annabella Reservoir
 Bear Valley Reservoir
 Big Lake
 Boobe Hole Reservoir
 Broadhead Lakes
 Cold Spring (near Twin Ponds)
 Coots Slough
 Crater Lakes
 Davis Hollow Reservoir
 Deep Lake
 Duck Lake
 Emerald Lakes
 Farnsworth Reservoir
 Farrell Pond
 Fish Lake
 Floating Island Lake
 Forsyth Reservoir
 Gardner Hollow Reservoirs
 Gates Lake
 Hamilton Reservoir
 Harves River Reservoir
 Hepplers Ponds
 Hunts Lakes
 Indian Springs
 Jeffery Reservoir
 Jensen Spring
 Johnson Valley Reservoir
 Killian Spring
 Koosharem Reservoir
 Lake Louise
 Lost Creek Reservoir
 Lower Hunts Lake
 Magelby Reservoir
 Meeks Lake
 Mill Meadow Reservoir (part)
 Morrell Pond
 Mud Lake
 Oles Pond
 Ox Spring
 Paradise Valley Lake
 Redmond Lake
 Rex Reservoir
 Rim Seep
 Rocky Ford Reservoir
 Saleratus Reservoir
 Salina Reservoir
 Sargent Lake
 Scrub Flat Reservoir
 Sheep Valley Reservoir
 Silas Spring
 Skutumpah Reservoir
 Slide Lake
 Snow Fence Pond
 Snow Lake
 Solomon Reservoir
 Spring Reservoir
 The Potholes
 Three Creeks Reservoir
 Three Lakes (two of the three)
 Tidwell Pond
 Twin Lake
 Twin Ponds
 Washburn Reservoir
 Willies Flat Reservoir
 Willow Creek Reservoir
 Willow Lake
 Wood Hollow Reservoir

Demographics

As of the 2000 United States Census, there were 18,842 people, 6,081 households, and 4,907 families in the county. The population density was 9.86/sqmi (3.81/km2). There were 7,016 housing units at an average density of 3.67/sqmi (1.42/km2). The racial makeup of the county was 95.61% White, 0.27% Black or African American, 2.00% Native American, 0.26% Asian, 0.09% Pacific Islander, 0.79% from other races, and 0.99% from two or more races. 2.55% of the population were Hispanic or Latino of any race.

There were 6,081 households, of which 43.00% had children under 18 living with them, 70.10% were married couples living together, 7.80% had a female householder with no husband present, and 19.30% were non-families. Of the 6,081 households in Sevier County, 155 are unmarried partner households: 137 heterosexual, 11 same-sex male, and seven same-sex female. 17.60% of all households were made up of individuals, and 9.40% had someone living alone who was 65 years of age or older. The average household size was 3.03, and the average family size was 3.44.

The county population contained 34.50% under 18, 10.10% from 18 to 24, 22.90% from 25 to 44, 19.70% from 45 to 64, and 12.90% who were 65 years of age or older. The median age was 30 years. For every 100 females, there were 99.20 males. For every 100 females aged 18 and over, there were 97.40 males.

The median income for a household in the county was $35,822, and the median income for a family was $40,110. Males had a median income of $32,632 versus $19,228 for females. The per capita income for the county was $14,180. About 8.30% of families and 10.80% of the population were below the poverty line, including 12.80% of those under age 18 and 8.50% of those aged 65 or over.

Features
Interstate 70 runs through the county. As Richfield is about halfway between the major cities of Los Angeles, California and Denver, Colorado, it has built a hospitality industry, with motels and restaurants serving travelers.

Fremont Indian State Park is found in the Clear Creek Canyon, adjacent to I-70. It is noted for its archaeological remains from the ancient Native American Fremont culture. Its museum displays found artifacts.

Politics
Sevier County is traditionally Republican. In no national election since 1936 has the county selected the Democratic Party candidate (as of 2020).

Communities

Cities
 Aurora
 Monroe
 Richfield (county seat)
 Salina

Towns
 Annabella
 Central Valley
 Elsinore
 Glenwood
 Joseph
 Koosharem
 Redmond
 Sigurd

Unincorporated communities
 Austin
 Burrville
 Cove
 Gooseberry
 Nibley
 Sevier
 Venice

Former communities
 Prattville
 Vermillion (absorbed into Sigurd)

See also

 National Register of Historic Places listings in Sevier County, Utah

References

External links

 

 
1865 establishments in Utah Territory
Populated places established in 1865